Oscar Kreuzer (14 June 1887 – 3 May 1968) was a male tennis and rugby player from Germany.

Biography
Kreuzer was born at Frankfurt am Main on 14 June 1887.

He played at the 1908 Summer Olympics and at the 1912 Summer Olympics in Stockholm, Sweden where he won a bronze medal in the men's singles tournament. In 1912, he also reached the final at the World Hard Court Championships at Paris which he lost to his compatriot Otto Froitzheim. At Wimbledon, he reached his best result in 1913 where he advanced to the semifinals before being stopped by Stanley Doust.

Besides tennis, Kreuzer also excelled at rugby. He won the German championships with his club SC 1880 Frankfurt in 1910, and played several caps for Germany.

At the end of July 1914, he and Otto Froitzheim played the semifinal of the International Lawn Tennis Challenge at Pittsburgh against Australasia. When World War I broke out, the president of the local tennis club kept this from Froitzheim and Kreuzer as he didn't want to disrupt the match. The German team lost 0–5. On their way back to Germany, their Italian steamboat America was halted off Gibraltar by a British warship and they were placed in a prison in Gibraltar for several months before being sent to detention camps in England. While Kreuzer stayed at a camp near Leeds, officer Froitzheim was kept at Donnington Hall until the end of the war in 1918.

In 1920 he won the International German Championships at the Rothenbaum club in Hamburg, defeating Louis Maria Heyden in the final in three straight sets.

After he retired from playing tennis tournaments, Kreuzer settled at Wiesbaden, near his friend Froitzheim. He died there on 3 May 1968.

References

External links
 
 
 

1887 births
1968 deaths
German male tennis players
Olympic tennis players of Germany
Tennis players at the 1908 Summer Olympics
Tennis players at the 1912 Summer Olympics
Olympic bronze medalists for Germany
Olympic medalists in tennis
Medalists at the 1912 Summer Olympics
SC 1880 Frankfurt players
Tennis players from Frankfurt